Joseph Mario Contini (born January 29, 1957) is a Canadian retired professional ice hockey forward who played 68 games in the National Hockey League for the Colorado Rockies and Minnesota North Stars.

Junior career
Born in Galt, Ontario, Contini made an immediate impact during his rookie season as a member of the Hamilton Fincups of the Ontario Hockey League (OHL). Contini helped the Fincups to a 37–24–9 record in the 1974/75 season, amassing 90 points in the process. Contini continued his strong OHL career during the 1975/76 season earning 80 points his sophomore season. He was a key contributor on a very good Fincups team that won the 1976 Memorial Cup. Contini had an outstanding Memorial Cup, setting the record for fastest two goals during a Memorial Cup game (2 in 8 seconds) and fastest 3 goals (3 in 72 seconds) during their game on May 12, 1976 vs New Westminster. He is also tied for the most points ever in a single Memorial Cup game with 6 (May 12, 1976 vs New Westminster – 3 G, 3 A) in an 8–4 Hamilton victory.

Contini's third and final OHL season was cut short due to injury, he played only 28 games, but amassed 46 points on 17 goals and 29 assists. Fortunately, Contini was able to play for Canada men's national junior ice hockey team in the 1977 World Junior Ice Hockey Championships. Contini finished third on the squad in points, with 4 goals and 6 assists in 7 games, and helped his country earn a silver medal.

Pro career
Contini was drafted by the Colorado Rockies in the eighth round, 126th overall, in the 1977 NHL amateur draft. Contini played 37 games for the Rockies in the 1977/78 season, scoring 12 goals and adding 9 assists for 21 points. Contini followed up his rookie season with 5 goals and 12 assists in 30 games for the Rockies. Contini split the 1979/80 season between the Fort Worth Texans, scoring goal and adding two assists for three points in 8 games, and the Oklahoma City Stars, where he played 58 games, scoring 19 goals and adding 43 assists for 63 points.

Contini signed with the Minnesota North Stars as a free agent prior to the 1980/81 season, but only suited up for the North Stars for 1 game. He spent the remainder of the season with the Oklahoma City Stars, scoring 32 goals and 63 assists for 95 points in 77 games. Contini played his final pro season with the Hershey Bears and the Muskegon Mohawks. Contini played 56 games in Hershey, earning 57 points in 56 games with 20 goals and 37 assists and 17 games in Muskegon, where he tallied 9 goals and 7 assists.

Coaching
At the age of 26, Contini was named head coach of the Guelph Platers of the OHL. He spent two years at the helm, from 1982 to 1984.

Career statistics

Regular season and playoffs

International

References

External links
 

1947 births
Living people
Canadian people of Italian descent
Canadian ice hockey centres
Colorado Rockies (NHL) draft picks
Colorado Rockies (NHL) players
Flint Generals players
Fort Worth Texans players
Hamilton Fincups players
Hershey Bears players
Ice hockey people from Ontario
Minnesota North Stars players
Muskegon Mohawks players
Oklahoma City Stars players
Philadelphia Firebirds (AHL) players
Phoenix Roadrunners (CHL) players
Sportspeople from Cambridge, Ontario